Vijaya Mehta (born 4 November 1934), is a noted Indian Marathi film and theatre director and also an actor in many films from the Parallel Cinema. She is a founder member of Mumbai-based theatre group, Rangayan with playwright Vijay Tendulkar, and actors Arvind Deshpande and Shriram Lagoo. She is most known for her acclaimed role in film Party (1984) and for her directorial ventures, Rao Saheb (1986) and Pestonjee (1988). As the founder member of theatre group, Rangayan, she became a leading figure in the experimental Marathi theatre of the 1960s.

Early life and education
Vijaya Mehta was born Vijaya Jaywant in Baroda, Gujarat in 1934. She graduated from Mumbai University. She studied theatre with Ebrahim Alkazi in Delhi and with Adi Marzban.

Career
She became a major figure in 60s Marathi experimental theatre. She is a founder member of theatre group, Rangayan with playwright Vijay Tendulkar, Arvind Deshpande and Shriram Lagoo.

Her stage production of C. T. Khanolkar's Ek Shoonya Bajirao is considered as a landmark in contemporary Indian theatre. She introduced Bertold Brecht into Marathi theatre with adaptation of The Caucasian Chalk Circle (Ajab Nyay Vartulacha), and Ionesco with Chairs.

She collaborated on Indo-German theatre projects with German director Fritz Bennewitz including a traditional performance of Bhasa's Mudrarakshasa with German actors. Except Pestonjee, most of her work consists of film and television adaptations of her stage plays.

She was awarded the 1975 Sangeet Natak Akademi Award for excellence in Direction, in 1986 she won the National Film Award for Best Supporting Actress for her role in Rao Saheb (1986).

Personal life
She first married  Harin Khote, son of actress Durga Khote, however he died at an early age, leaving behind two young sons. Thereafter, she married Farrokh Mehta.

Filmography
 Kalyug (1981) - Actor 
 Smriti Chitre (1982, TV film) - Director, Actor a
 Shakuntalam (1986, TV film) - Director
 Party (1984) - Actor
 Rao Saheb (1985) - Director, Screenwriter, Actor
 Haveli Bulund Thi (1987, TV film) - Director
 Hamidabai Ki Kothi (1987, TV film)  - Director
 Pestonjee (1988) - Director, Screenwriter
 Lifeline (1991, TV Series) - Director
 Quest (2006) - Actor

Awards
 1975 Sangeet Natak Akademi Award
 1985 Asia Pacific Film Festival: Best Actress: Party
 1986 National Film Award for Best Supporting Actress: Rao Saheb
 2009 Tanveer Sanmaan
 2012 Sangeet Natak Akademi Tagore Ratna

See also
 Theatre in India

Further reading
Abode of Colour, an autobiographical account by Vijaya Mehta
 Vijaya Mehta on theatre and Guru Mani Madhava Cakyar

References

External links
 

1934 births
Gujarati people
University of Mumbai alumni
People from Vadodara
Indian women dramatists and playwrights
20th-century Indian film directors
Indian stage actresses
Indian film actresses
Indian women film directors
Academic staff of the National School of Drama
Recipients of the Sangeet Natak Akademi Award
Living people
Indian theatre directors
Marathi theatre
Best Supporting Actress National Film Award winners
Indian women television directors
Indian television directors
Actresses in Hindi cinema
Actresses in Gujarati cinema
20th-century Indian actresses
Women writers from Gujarat
20th-century Indian dramatists and playwrights
Screenwriters from Gujarat
Recipients of the Padma Shri in arts
20th-century Indian women writers
21st-century Indian film directors
Actresses from Gujarat
21st-century Indian actresses
Indian television writers
Indian women screenwriters
Film directors from Gujarat
Indian television actresses
Indian women television writers